The Constellation egg is one of two Easter eggs designed under the supervision of Peter Carl Fabergé in 1917, for the last Tsar of Russia, Nicholas II as an Easter gift to his wife, the Tsarina Alexandra Feodorovna.  It was the last Imperial Fabergé egg designed. It remains unfinished.

Description
Due to the Russian Revolution of 1917, the egg was never finished or presented to Tsar Nicholas' wife, the Tsaritsa Alexandra Feodorovna.

The egg, as it is known from a 1917 document, was made of blue glass with a crystal base, and the Leo sign of the zodiac is engraved on the glass. (The heir to the Russian throne, Alexei Nikolaevich, Tsarevich of Russia, was a Leo.) There are stars that are marked by diamonds, and there is a clock mechanism inside the egg.

History

In 2001, a similar item was discovered in the Fersman Mineralogical Museum in Moscow, and experts believe it to be the unfinished 1917 egg by Fabergé. It is an unfinished item without the diamonds, base and silver putti intended to decorate it. Its authenticity is supported by numerous studies by leading Russian experts.

Second egg
Russian art collector Alexander Ivanov claims that he owns the original (and finished) egg. In 2003–2004 he said that he acquired this egg in the late 1990s and affirmed that "the Fersman Museum erroneously continues to claim that it has the original egg." Fabergé experts do not agree and think his egg is a Fauxbergé. However, Ivanov's egg is in the Fabergé Museum in Baden-Baden, which houses part of his Fabergé collection.

References

Sources

External links

 The piece is part of the Fersman Mineralogical Museum collection, Moscow
 Description and history of the object
Fabergé Museum website

1917 works
Imperial Fabergé eggs
Tourist attractions in Moscow
Fabergé clock eggs